This is the list of äkıms of Atyrau Region that have held the position since 1992.

List of Äkıms 

 Sağat Tügelbaev (7 February 1992 – 14 October 1994)
 Ravil Şyrdabaev (16 October 1994 – 18 February 1999)
 İmanğali Tasmağambetov (18 February 1999 – 16 December 2000)
 Serıkbek Däukeev (18 December 2000 – 3 April 2002)
 Aslan Musin (3 April 2002 – 4 October 2006)
 Bergei Rysqaliev (4 October 2006 – 15 August 2012)
 Baqtyqoja Izmūhambetov (15 August 2012 – 24 March 2016)
 Nūrlan Noğaev (26 March 2016 – 18 December 2019)
 Mahamet Dosmūhambetov (18 December 2019 – present)

References 

Government of Kazakhstan